The United States Department of Education's measurement of the status dropout rate is the percentage of 16 to 24-year-olds who are not enrolled in school and have not earned a high school credential. This rate is different from the event dropout rate and related measures of the status completion and average freshman completion rates. The status high school dropout rate in 2009 was 8.1%. There are many risk factors for high school dropouts. These can be categorized into social and academic risk factors.

Whites and specific members of racial and ethnic minority groups drop out at higher rates than Asian American students, as do those from low-income families, from single-parent households, mentally disabled students, and from families in which one or both parents also did not complete high school.  Students at risk for dropout based on academic risk factors are those who often have a history of absenteeism and grade retention, academic trouble, and more general disengagement from school life.

High school dropouts in the United States are more likely to be unemployed, have low-paying jobs, be incarcerated, have children at early ages and/or become single parents. There is not a single race in the U.S. that as of 2019, has a 90 percent graduation rate. In order for the U.S. to have achieved this rate by 2020, almost 200,000 more students would have had to graduate in time.

Theories

Academic mediation theory
Research has shown that poor academic achievement is one of the strongest predictors of high school dropout. This theory examines the mediation effect of poor academic achievement on other factors, such as deviant affiliation, personal deviance, family socialization and structural strains, associated with school dropout. Essentially, it looks at how poor academic achievement interacts with and affects the relationship between high school dropout and other factors. The model for this theory was shown to statistically fit at an acceptable degree.

General deviance theory
This theory looks at the relationship between deviant behavior and dropout. Deviant behavior includes delinquency, drug use, and early pregnancy. There is a very strong relationship as general deviance is a strong direct predictor of dropout beyond the effect mediated by poor academic achievement.

Deviant affiliation theory
The relationship described in this theory is one between an individual bonding with antisocial peers and its effect on dropout rates. Students receive the classification of antisocial if they are likely to drop out themselves and/or have low school attachment. If an individual has antisocial friends, he/she is much more likely to drop out of school regardless of how well he/she is doing in school.

Poor family socialization theory
The institution of family appears to very formative for a developing child. As such, this theory examines the relationship between family background and dropout rates. The relationship is not particularly strong, past academic achievement has much more of an influence than poor family socialization. Factors of poor family socialization include low parental expectations and a parent's lack of education.

Structural strains theory
This theory focuses on the relationship between demographic factors, such as socioeconomic status, gender and ethnicity, and dropout. Boys are much more likely to drop out than girls and dropouts are most likely from a family with a low socioeconomic status. There has been contention over the influence of ethnicity on dropout rates. However, it is clear that it does have some influence. Low socioeconomic status is a significant predictor of dropout beyond poor academic achievement. Ethnicity and gender had no significance beyond their influence on academic achievement.

Risk factors

Social risk factors
Social risk factors are demographic variables that are associated with a higher likelihood of school difficulties and, consequently, higher dropout rates. These demographic factors include race/ethnicity, age, language-minority status, gender, family income (socioeconomic status), parents' level of education and family structure. Research shows that members of racial and ethnicity minority groups drop out at higher rates than white students, as do individuals who have a low socioeconomic status, come from a single-parent household or whose parents did not complete high school. In 2010 the dropout rates of 16- through 24-year-olds who are not enrolled in school and have not earned a high school credential were: 5.1% for white students, 8% for black students, 15.1% for Hispanic students, and 4.2% for Asian students.

Academic risk factors
Academic risk factors refer to the students' performance in school and are highly related to school level problems. These factors include absenteeism, grade retention, special education placement, low performance and grades, and low educational expectations. Poor academic achievement has a very strong relationship with increased likelihood of dropping out. Grade retention can increase the odds of dropping out by as much as 250 percent above those of similar students who were not retained. Students who drop out typically have a history of absenteeism, grade retention and academic trouble and are more disengaged from school life.

School structure, curriculum and size are factors influential to increased likelihood of a student experiencing academic risk factors. The school curriculum has been found to affect the likelihood of a student to drop out regardless of which courses the individual was taking. Students who attended schools that offered Calculus or fewer courses below the level of Algebra 1 had a reduced risk of dropping out of school by 56%.

School size has a very strong non-linear correlation with dropout rate. A study done by Werblow found that increases in school size can be "associated with a 12% increase in average student dropout rate". However, once a school becomes very large, its size seems to hardly affect dropout rates except for its effect on other factors. Large schools, enrolling between 1,500 and 2,500 students, were found to have the largest proportion of students who dropped out, 12%. Small schools have the lowest dropout rate.

The type or structure of a school was found to be irrelevant in a study done by Lee once other factors, such as demographics and size, were accounted for. The only way school structure affected dropout rates was through teacher-student relationships. Students who attended schools with more positive student-teacher interaction were less likely to drop out. The effect of this relationship was largely determined by the type of school. In small or medium-sized public or Catholic schools, 'positive student-teacher relations led to an 86% decrease in the odds of dropping out". However, student-teacher relations did not significantly affect small or medium private schools.

Role of relationships
As mentioned above, teacher-student interactions can have a large influence on the likelihood of a student dropping out of high school. The better the relationships between students and teachers, the less likely the student is to drop out of school. However, if a teacher identifies a student as on track and having a positive attitude towards school, but does not necessarily have personal interaction with the student, that student has a higher chance of dropping out.

The relationships students have with their peers also play a role in influencing a student's likelihood of dropping out. Building relationships with anti-social peers was found by Battin-Pearson to be a strong and direct predictor of dropout beyond the influence of poor academic achievement. Students who had deviant friends were more likely to drop out of school early regardless of their achievement in school.

Parent-child relationships have also been found to be very influential in whether or not a student decides to stay in school. The better the relationship, as demonstrated through positive interaction and parental involvement, the more likely the student will stay in school. If a student does not have a good relationship with his/her parents, the student is more likely to drop out even if he has good grades and good behavior. This demonstrates that parental support is crucial, as students with good grades and behavior are typically more likely to stay in school. However, parental expectations or degree of education are not as influential. A study by Battin-Pearson found that these two factors did not contribute significantly to dropout beyond what was explained by poor academic achievement.

Motivation for dropping out
While the above factors certainly place a student at risk for dropout, they are not always the reason the student identifies as their motivation for dropping out. However, there is not a large body of research describing the students' personal motivation. One study found that the main reasons students reported for dropping out included uninteresting classes (a lack of engagement with school life and classes), unmotivated (students typically said teachers did not demand enough or were not inspirational), personal reasons (had to get a job, became a parent, had to support or care for a family member), and academic challenges (felt like they could not keep up, felt unprepared for high school, had to repeat a grade, or graduation requirements seemed out of reach).

Another motivation for students to dropout of school comes from schools practicing zero tolerance policies. Zero tolerance policies require school officials to give out harsh and consistent punishments for misbehavior, regardless of the students’ background or circumstances. The Zero Tolerance Task Force was commissioned by the American Psychological Association (APA) to thoroughly examine evidence regarding the academics and behavioral outcomes from the use of zero tolerance policies. The task force concluded with recommendations for phasing out zero tolerance policies and implementing more positive alternatives. In a wide lens view of constant use of zero tolerance policies, the rising number of students who have been suspended and expelled correlates to an increased trend of school dropout and lack of students graduating on-time.

These policies also contribute to the school-to-prison pipeline. The school-to-prison pipeline displays students who have been pushed out of their schools and into the criminal justice system. Once students are forced out of school, they may seek alternatives for a sense of acceptance - which may come from negative experiences. A prime example of this is the impact of zero tolerance policies on students of color. A major concern is the use of unreasonable discipline for these students, especially African Americans.  Evidence has shown that the inconsistency in discipline does not directly stem from an economic disadvantage or Black students demonstrating significantly higher rates of violence or disorder. Research continues to document that Black students are often disciplined more harshly for minor and subjective reasons relative to their peers. From the growing research literature, this inordinate discipline of Black students may stem from a lack of teacher training in class management and preparation of culturally competent practices.  The students' feeling of security from other outside forces may lead to their loss of trust in the school system and ultimately dropping out.

Early parenthood and pregnancy is a motivation to dropout. An article stated that early parenthood was the number one cause for school dropout in teen girls, as thirty percent of teen girls said pregnancy was the reason why they dropped out.

In some cases, social reasons such as bullying, harassment, or an inability to fit into the school community for reasons outside of their control are reasons.

The effect of standardized tests
The No Child Left Behind Act implemented a "standardized, high-stakes, test-based accountability system".  The purpose was to increase accountability of schools for measured improvements of students' knowledge. In order to accomplish this, test scores were disaggregated into subgroups to better evaluate if the historically under-served minorities were receiving a good education.  Under this system, a school cannot receive a high rating if the scores of the subgroups do not improve.  Based on a study done by researchers from Rice University and University of Texas at Austin, the policy inadvertently encourages students to drop out of high school.  Teachers and administrators utilize grade retention as a strategy to improve test scores and ensure positive ratings.

Consequences

Individual
High school dropouts are less likely to be active labor force participants and are more likely to be unemployed than their more educated counterparts. The current unemployment rate for high school dropouts is about 56 percent greater than that for high school completers. Lifetime earnings for this group are estimated to be $260,000 less than those for high school graduates. Female dropouts are much more likely to become single mothers and consequently be more likely to have an income under the poverty threshold or live on welfare. High school dropouts make up 68 percent of the nation’s prison population. Nearly 37% of dropouts live in poor/near poor families. Additionally, high school dropouts have a life expectancy that is 3–5 years shorter than high school graduates.

Graduating students from high school who are not prepared for college, however, also generates problems, as the college dropout rate exceeds the high school rate. To pursue their studies, students unprepared for college may accumulate a large amount of debt, which must be paid back regardless.

A number high school dropouts however became successful. Walt Disney was an American business magnate, cartoonist, and filmmaker who dropped out of high school at the age of sixteen in hopes of joining the army. Bobby Fischer was an American chess prodigy, grandmaster, and the eleventh World Chess Champion who also dropped out of high school when he turned age sixteen and later explained "You don't learn anything in school". Glen L. Roberts, who dropped out of high school in 10th grade, left the United States after a career of exposing government abuses, renounced his citizenship, and became one of the few former Americans to voluntarily become stateless.

Societal
The problems created at an individual level due to the lack of a high school diploma or GED affect society as a whole.  Those who cannot find jobs cannot pay taxes, resulting in a loss of revenue for the government.  For each cohort of 18-year-olds who never complete high school, the US loses $192 billion in income and tax revenue. Moretti estimates that by increasing the high school completion rate of males by one percent, the US could save up to $1.4 billion annually in reduced costs from crime.  A substantial amount of taxpayer money goes toward maintaining the prisons.  And, in 2004, each high school dropout was responsible for nearly $100,000 in health-related losses.  Because of these factors, an average high school dropout will cost the government over $292,000.

Measurement of the dropout rate
The U.S. Department of Education identifies four different rates to measure high school dropout and completion in the United States. Each rate contributes unique information. 	
 The event dropout rate estimates the percentage of high school students who left high school between the beginning of one school year and the beginning of the next without earning a high school diploma or its equivalent (e.g., a GED). Event rates can be used to track annual changes in the dropout behavior of students in the U.S. school system.
 The status dropout rate reports the percentage of individuals in a given age range who are not in school and have not earned a high school diploma or equivalent credential. This rate focuses on an overall age group as opposed to individuals in the U.S. school system, so it can be used to study general population issues.
 The status completion rate indicates the percentage of individuals in a given age range who are not in high school and who have earned a high school diploma or equivalent credential, irrespective of when the credential was earned. The rate focuses on an overall age group as opposed to individuals in the U.S. school system, so it can be used to study general population issues.
 The averaged freshman graduation rate estimates the proportion of public high school freshmen who graduate with a regular diploma four years after starting ninth grade. The rate focuses on public high school students as opposed to all high school students or the general population and is designed to provide an estimate of on-time graduation from high school. Thus, it provides a measure of the extent to which public high schools are graduating students within the expected period of four years.

Notable dropouts
 Don Adams (1923–2005), actor; dropped out of DeWitt Clinton High School
 Danny Aiello (1933–2019), actor
 Dean Ambrose (born 1985), professional wrestler 
 Richard Avedon (1923–2004), filmmaker
 Billie Joe Armstrong (born 1972), musician; dropped out of Pinole Valley High School
 Brigitte Bardot (born 1934), actress
 Carole Baskin (born 1961), activist
 Harry Belafonte (born 1927), musician 
 Clint Black (born 1962), musician
 Robert Blake (born 1933), actor
 Mary J. Blige (born 1971), musician
 Sonny Bono (1935–1998), actor/singer/politician; dropped out of Inglewood High School
 Marlon Brando (1924–2004), actor; dropped out of Shattuck-Saint Mary's
 Ellen Burstyn (born 1932), actress; dropped out of Cass Technical High School
 Nicolas Cage (born 1964), actor; dropped out of Beverly Hills High School
 Carroll A. Campbell Jr. (1940–2005), politician; dropped out of Greenville High School
 Glen Campbell (1936–2017), actor/singer
 George Carlin (1937–2008), comedian/actor
 John Chancellor (1927–1996), journalist
 Cher (born 1946), actress/singer; dropped out of Montclair College Preparatory School
 Bill Cosby (born 1937), actor/comedian/author; dropped out of Germantown High School
 Roger Daltrey (born 1944), member of The Who
 Jimmy Dean (1928–2010), singer
 Robert De Niro (born 1943), actor
 Weston "Westballz" Dennis (born 1991), Super Smash Bros. Melee player; dropped out of John Burroughs High School
 Johnny Depp (born 1963), actor; dropped out of high school to pursue a music career
 Bo Derek (born 1956), actress, dropped out of Narbonne High School
 Andy Dinh (born 1992), former League of Legends professional  and Team SoloMid owner; dropped out of Westmont High School
 Cameron Diaz (born 1972), actress; dropped out of Long Beach Polytechnical High School
 Robert Downey Jr. (born 1965), actor; dropped out of Santa Monica High School
 Eminem (born 1972), rapper; dropped out of Lincoln High School
 Lola Falana (born 1942), actress
 Carrie Fisher (1956–2016), actress/novelist
 Bobby Flay (born 1964), celebrity chef
 George Foreman (born 1949), boxer
 Michael J. Fox (born 1961), actor
 Redd Foxx (1922–1991), comedian/actor
 Aretha Franklin (1942–2018), singer
 Jerry Garcia (1942–1995), member of The Grateful Dead
 James Garner (1928–2014), actor
 Marvin Gaye (1939–1984), singer
 Jackie Gleason (1916–1987), actor; dropped out of John Adams High School
 Whoopi Goldberg (born 1955), actress/TV host; dropped out of Washington Irving Campus
 Vicente Gonzalez (born 1967), politician, lawyer
 Marjoe Gortner (born 1944), actor
 Cary Grant (1904–1986), actor
 Eugene Turenne Gregorie (1908–2002), American yacht designer and automobile designer
 George Gund III (1937–2013), businessman/sports entrepreneur
 Gene Hackman (born 1930), actor
 Merle Haggard (1937–2016), singer/songwriter
 Alexis Haines (born 1991), American television personality and writer; dropped out of Indian Hills High School
 Armie Hammer (born 1986), actor; dropped out of Los Angeles Baptist High School
 Arin Hanson (born 1987), animator/Internet personality
 Sterling Hayden (1916–1986), actor
 Lena Horne (1917–2010), actress
 Moe Howard (1897–1975), actor
 Rick James (1948–2004), singer; dropped out of Bennett High School
 Jay-Z (born 1969), rapper/entrepreneur; dropped out of Trenton Central High School
 Waylon Jennings (1937–2002), member of The Highwaymen
 Alan King (1927–2004), actor/comedian
 Eartha Kitt (1927–2008), singer/actress
 Evel Knievel (1938–2007), daredevil; dropped out of Butte High School
 Al Lewis (1923–2006), actor; dropped out of Thomas Jefferson High School
 Jerry Lewis (1926–2017), actor; dropped out of Irvington High School
 Loretta Lynn (born 1932), singer
 Anthony Mann (1906–1967), director; dropped out of Central High School
 Charles Manson (1934–2017), songwriter-turned-cult leader 
 Richard Marcinko (1940–2021), first commander of Seal Team Six
 Dean Martin (1917–1995), actor; dropped out of Steubenville High School
 Lee Marvin (1924–1987), actor
 Elaine May (born 1932), actor/screenwriter/director
 Charlotte McKinney (born 1993), actress/model; dropped out of William R. Boone High School
 Steve McQueen (1930–1980), actor
 Melina Mercouri (1920–1994), singer/actress/politician
 Robert Mitchum (1917–1997), actor
 Marilyn Monroe (1926–1962), actress
 Demi Moore (born 1962), actress; dropped out of Fairfax High School
 Tracy Morgan (born 1968), actor/comedian; dropped out of DeWitt Clinton High School
 Vic Morrow (1929–1982), actor
 Earl "Madman" Muntz (1914–1987), businessman and engineer involved in consumer electronics industry
 Audie Murphy (1924–1971), war hero/actor; middle school dropout - never made it to high school
 Olivia Newton-John (1948–2022), singer/actress
 Jack Paar (1918–2004), comedian
 Al Pacino (born 1940), actor; dropped out of High School of Performing Arts
 Vincent Palermo (born 1944) mobster; dropped out of school in Brooklyn, New York
 Katy Perry (born 1984), singer; dropped out of Santa Barbara Don Pueblos High School                                       
 Tom Petty (1950–2017), singer
 Richard Pryor (1940–2005), actor/comedian
 Anthony Quinn (1915–2001), actor
 Reckful (1989–2020), esports player, Twitch streamer, and YouTuber
 Sam Reich (born 1984), CEO and internet personality; dropped out of Buckingham Browne & Nichols School in 2000
 Harold Robbins (1916–1997), novelist/screenwriter
 Axl Rose (born 1962), singer of Guns N' Roses; dropped out of Jefferson High School (Indiana)
 Todd Rose (born 1974), professor at Harvard Graduate School of Education
 Rene Russo (born 1964), actress; dropped out of Burroughs High School
 Vidal Sassoon (1928–2012), hair/makeup artist
 Cher Scarlett (born 1985 or 1986), software engineer and activist; dropped out of Juanita High School 
 Christopher Scarver (born 1969), criminal; dropped out of James Madison High School at 11th grade
 Frank Sinatra (1915–1998), singer-actor
 James Spader (born 1960), actor; dropped out of Phillips Academy
 Rod Steiger (1925–2002), actor
 Emma Stone (born 1988), actress; dropped out of Xavier College Prepartory
 Hilary Swank (born 1974), actress; dropped out of South Pasadena High School
 Quentin Tarantino (born 1963), film director/screenwriter; dropped out of Narbonne High School
 Tiny Tim (1932–1996), singer
 Uma Thurman (born 1970), actress; dropped out of Northfield Mount Hermon School
 Randy Travis (born 1959), singer-actor
 John Travolta (born 1954), actor; dropped out of Dwight Morrow High School
 Mike Tyson (born 1966), boxer
 Vanilla Ice (born 1967), rap impresario/actor/home improvement magnate
 Mark Wahlberg (born 1971), actor; dropped out of Copley Square High School
 Joanna Wang (born 1988), singer; dropped out of Gabrielino High School
 Barry Williams (born 1954), singer/actor; dropped out of grammar school
 Flip Wilson (1933–1998), TV host/actor/writer
 Tiffany Young (born 1989), singer; dropped out of Diamond Bar High School at age 15 to pursue music in South Korea

See also
Racial achievement gap in the United States#High school dropout rates
School dropouts in Latin America

Footnotes

References
Battin-Pearson, Sara (2000). "Predictors of Early High School Dropout: A Test of Five Theories". Journal of Educational Psychology.
Bridgeland, John M. (2006). "The Silent Epidemic: Perspectives of High School Dropouts".
Englund, Michelle M., Byron Egeland, W. Andrew Collins (2008). “Exceptions to High School Dropout Predictions in a Low-Income Sample: Do Adults Make a Difference?” J Soc Issues.
Harlow, Caroline W. (2003). "Education and Correctional Populations." U.S. Department of Justice, Office of Justice Programs.
Lee, Valerie E., David T. Burkam (2003) "Dropping out of High School: The Role of School Organization and Structure". American Educational Research Journal.
Levin, H. M. (2005). “The social costs of inadequate education.” Summary prepared for the symposium on the Social Costs of Inadequate Education, Teachers College Columbia University, October 2005.
Mason, Marcellars L. (2008). "The Influence of Selected Academic, Demographic and Instructional Program Related Factors on High School Student Dropout Rates".
McNeil, L. M., Coppola, E., Radigan, J., & Vasquez Heilig, J. (2008). "Avoidable losses: High-stakes accountability and the dropout crisis". Education Policy Analysis Archives.
Moretti, Enrico (2005). “Does education reduce participation in criminal activities?” Prepared for the symposium on the Social Costs of Inadequate Education, Teachers College Columbia University, October 2005.
Phelps, R. P. (2009, Spring). "Dropping the ball on dropouts." Educational Horizons, 87(3). 
Rouse, C. E. (2005). “Labor market consequences of an inadequate education.” Paper prepared for the symposium on the Social Costs of Inadequate Education, Teachers College Columbia University, October 2005.
Sum, Andrew, Ishwar Khatiwada, Joseph McLaughlin (2009). "The Consequences of Dropping Out of High School". Center for Labor Market Studies Publications.
Werblow, Jacob, Luke Duesbery (2009). "The Impact of High School Size on Math Achievement and Dropout Rate". The High School Journal.
2009. "Dropout and Completion Rates in the United States: 2007". National Center for Education Statistics.
2011. "The Condition of Education 2011". National Center for Education Statistics.
2012. “Table A-4. Employment status of the civilian population 25 years and over by educational attainment.” Bureau of Labor Statistics.

Students in the United States
Secondary education in the United States